Mark Potter may refer to:
Mark Potter (judge) (born 1937), British judge
Mark Potter (musician), British musician from the band Elbow
Mark Potter (sportscaster) (born 1960), Canadian sports broadcaster